Laudakia dayana, commonly known as the Haridwar agama, is a species of lizard in the family Agamidae. The species is native to extreme northern India.

Geographic range
L. dayana is found in the Indian state of Uttarakhand, which includes Haridwar, and in the union territories of Ladakh, Jammu and Kashmir.

Etymology
The specific name, dayana, is in honor of English ichthyologist Francis Day.

Habitat

Reproduction
L. dayana is oviparous.

References

Further reading
Baig KJ, Böhme W (1997). "Partition of the Stellio group of Agama into two distinct genera: Acanthocerus FITZINGER, 1843, and Laudakia GRAY, 1845 (Sauria: Agamidae)". 8th Ord. Gen. Meet. Soc. European Herp. (Laudakia dayana, new combination, p. 36).
Boulenger GA (1885). Catalogue of the Lizards in the British Museum (Natural History). Volume I. Geckonidæ, Eublepharidæ, Uroplatidæ, Pygopodidæ, Agamidæ. London: Trustees of the British Museum (Natural History). (Taylor and Francis, printers). xii + 436 pp. + Plates I-XXXII. (Agama dayana, new combination, p. 362).
Boulenger GA (1890). The Fauna of British India, Including Ceylon and Burma. Reptilia and Batrachia. London: Secretary of State for India in Council. (Taylor and Francis, printers). xviii + 541 pp. (Agama dayana, p. 148).
Stoliczka F (1871). "Notes on new or little known Indian Lizards". Proceedings of the Asiatic Society of Bengal (Calcutta) 1871: 192–195. (Stellio dayanus, new species, p. 194).

Laudakia
Lizards of Asia
Reptiles of India
Endemic fauna of India
Haridwar
Taxa named by Ferdinand Stoliczka
Reptiles described in 1871